Tasburgh is a civil parish and a village in the south of Norfolk, England, located approximately 8 miles south of Norwich. It lies on the A140 road, north of Long Stratton and south of Newton Flotman. The River Tas flows nearby and Tasburgh Hall lies to the west of the village. The local church is dedicated to St. Mary the Virgin.
The village is made up of Upper Tasburgh and Lower Tasburgh. The majority of Lower Tasburgh contains buildings from the early days of the village whilst Upper Tasburgh is made up of more modern housing.

The villages name means 'Taesa's fortification' and could also be interpreted as 'pleasant/convenient fortification'.

Children of primary school age attend Henry Preston Primary School, in Upper Tasburgh, whereas secondary school students attend Long Stratton High School. 
 
The village hall and adjacent social club is used for a range of functions and is home to Tasburgh's community run post office, set up following the closure of the post office store on Church Road in 2013.

A public house, The Countryman, is located in the village, by the A140. This is opposite the site of a former Little Chef restaurant, which has since become a garden building show centre.

The village is well served by public transport, with frequent bus services between Norwich and Long Stratton, operated by First Norfolk & Suffolk and Simonds of Botesdale calling in Tasburgh.

History

Early and ancient history
A large hill fort (Ad Taum) abuts the village at the northwest, and the village church is built within it. This may be a remnant of the Danish invasion of the ninth century.

Tasburgh church is a traditional Norfolk Saxon church of flint with a round tower.

The first human beings to leave their mark on Tasburgh were fur-clad Mesolithic hunter bands some time between 8500 BC and 4500 BC.
Between what is now Low Road and the River Tas, behind both the old Horseshoes public house and the nearby garage workshop, a scatter of fine flint flakes has revealed where hunters trimmed their spear and arrow heads at a site where firm ground came close to the river by a ford which is still marked on maps. A second ford crossing the tributary stream from Hempnall lay a short distance to the south and remains in use, partly bridged, to this day.

From their base the hunters could thus easily range through the wooded slopes on either side of the valleys of the Tas and the Hempnall stream, fishing, picking hazel nuts and berries or hunting deer, wild cattle and wild pigs. More of their flints have turned up higher on the valley slopes near the village hall and the church. Sometimes the chase must have taken them up into a dense forest of oak, elm and lime cloaking the flat clay land above the valleys, the area now called Upper Tasburgh.

To obtain sufficient food the small group of hunters would need constantly to move around an area far wider than Tasburgh. Their only easy route would be along the strip of open woodland on the light soils of the valley sides, sandwiched between the river marshes and the dark forest on the higher ground. The line of Saxlingham Lane and Low Road follows this route and leads to both of the fords.

By around 4000 BC the hunter bands had become merged with incoming Neolithic farmers. With flint axes and fire, patches of the valleyside woodland had been cleared for crops of primitive wheat and barley. Flint fragments from the farmer's tools have been found spread widely across the area enclosed by Grove Lane, Low Road and Church Hill where sites were likely to have been cultivated in rotation as the poorly manured soil became exhausted. Domesticated cattle, sheep and pigs would have been pastured on the marshes and in the woodland glades.

Flints of these early farmers have never been found on the higher ground of Upper Tasburgh north of Church Road and east of Old Hall Farm, where the thick forest and heavy clay soil seems to have resisted clearance and cultivation.

Some of these Neolithic people lived in what is now the eastern end of the churchyard where sherds of their pottery have been found together with pot boilers and considerable evidence of flint working. Their homes would have been circular thatched huts with wattle walls marking the beginning of human occupation in the area of the church.

After 2500 BC came the knowledge of making tools and weapons of copper then of bronze – far more adaptable and effective materials than flint in most cases. Relics of the Bronze Age have been unearthed in Henry Preston Road where a distinctive beaker marked a probable early Bronze Age burial and behind Hall Farm in the far south of the parish where burial mounds have been traced. In both cases the burials had been made on what was then the fringe of the likely cultivated area. Their style indicates the development of an upper class.

New lords arose soon after 500 BC when the warlike, artistic Celts brought access to iron, a far stronger and more accessible metal than bronze. Iron axes and iron-shod ploughs may well now have made inroads into the heavily forested claylands. Forty-three pieces of Iron Age pottery have been found close by the church, indicating that occupation continued in this area. By the first century AD the people of Norfolk and north Suffolk had become a single tribe, the Iceni, and coins of this age inscribed IC.DURO.T are reported to have been found in Tasburgh.

Chapel Hill, a knoll in the water meadows west of Tasburgh Hall, has produced extensive evidence of ancient burials. Ditch digging south west of the hillock in 1923 revealed several complete and broken amphorae (large wine jars). These were of a type used to transport Mediterranean wine in the first century AD. At this time wine was a rare luxury in Britain, consumed by the nobility, who had the habit of incorporating amphorae with the grave goods of their dead chieftains. This may signify that Chapel Hill is the burial site of an Icenian noble.

Roman Tasburgh
After the Romans invaded Britain in AD 43 the Iceni became a client kingdom falling under full Roman rule following their revolt under Queen Boudica in AD 60.

The most impressive sign of Roman times in Tasburgh was and remains the trunk road running from south to north across the parish, now the A140 which runs from Norwich to Ipswich. The road was constructed to link important Roman towns at London and Colchester with the newly established capital of the Iceni, Venta Icenorum, which stood alongside the River Tas at Caistor St Edmund. Built in a series of straight alignments thrust remorselessly across existing field patterns it stood on a thirty feet wide embankment. The roadway itself was twenty feet wide with a steeply cambered surface of hard packed gravel. With little maintenance from the end of the Roman era in AD 410 to the building of a turnpike in 1768, the embankment and road surface were worn down and the road fell away from its straight alignment on hills, including Tasburgh Hill. Where the road follows its original course in the north of the parish we can imagine couriers of the Imperial Post galloping by, smart mule carts, merchant's pack horses, lumbering farm wagons delaying other traffic and weary pedestrians; all using the road for many of the same reasons that we do today.

The possible sites of Roman farmhouses are indicated by scatters of tile fragments at three locations. Excavations in the eastern end of the churchyard in 1975 and in 1979/80 produced 3421b of Roman tile pieces and two sherds of Romano-British pottery (Point X on Map). Broken roof tiles and pottery fragments have been held to indicate a farmhouse at the top of the now defunct Figgett Lane (Point Y on Map). A third farmhouse has been inferred from tiles found at Church Wood near Rainthorpe Hall (Point Z on Map). A minor Roman road to, or passing, this farmhouse is indicated by the north-western parish boundary, once a lane, which runs in a straight line toward the corner of Church Wood. Straight lengths of parish boundaries sometimes indicate the line of a lost Roman road.

Two Roman coins have been found in the village, one close to the church and the other a short way uphill from the ford near the old Horseshoes public house. Pottery, held to be Roman, has been unearthed in association with burials at Chapel Hill.

Five miles north along the Roman trunk road stood the tribal capital, Venta Icenorum, which translates as 'market town of the Iceni'. The Tasburgh farms were well placed to supply produce to Venta with its town hall, forum, public baths, arena and temples. A few miles south along the trunk road, a little beyond the present day Long Stratton, was a village which had grown up around a relay station for the Imperial Post.

Roman rule finally disintegrated in AD 410. Anglo-Saxons, probably already here as mercenaries, were at Venta, soon to be joined by kinfolk arriving to settle. There is evidence that the better-off Britons fled leaving their villagers to be merged into an Anglo-Saxon dominated world which had become the kingdom of East Anglia by about AD 500.

The only signs of early Anglo-Saxon activity in Tasburgh are pottery fragments from the churchyard excavations indicating that this site continued to be occupied. By AD 627 East Anglia had a Christian king and in time a small wooden church may well have stood on the site of the present building. One hundred and forty-four pieces of pottery from the churchyard site dating to between AD 600 and AD 900 show that settlement there continued despite the interruptions of Danish raids and invasions from AD 841.

With Danes settled among the previous villagers the hamlet around the church expanded. The churchyard 'dig' revealed over 1000 pottery sherds dating to between AD 900 and AD 1100 together with strap fittings, loom weights, a knife and an arrowhead. The foundation trenches of a house of this period were also excavated. It was a wooden building thirty-six feet by seventeen feet and would have been open to the rafters with an open hearth from which smoke escaped through the thatched roof. About AD 1050 a small church of flints and mortar with a  round tower was built. The tower, since heightened, still stands as part of today's church.

At the place where the Roman road crossed the marshes of the Hempnall stream the embankment had worn away, leaving a miry morass aptly named Deepwade. This muddy obstacle and its name almost certainly originated in Saxon times when the local administrative area which included Tasburgh was called Depwade Hundred.
In AD 1086, twenty years after the Norman conquest of England, the Domesday Book was compiled giving us the first written record of Tasburgh. The village is named Taseburc and its dimensions are given as ten by seven furlongs, there was a watermill and the land was ploughed by five, eight-ox teams. Two hundred and thirty-one acres of arable land are recorded together with eighteen acres of meadowland, but we must bear in mind that Domesday 'acres' probably represented the taxable value of land rather than precise areas.

The arable land and meadow were divided into four holdings, each being part of a widespread portfolio of estates held from the king by four magnates. These absentee landlords included Roger Bigod, Sheriff of both Norfolk and Suffolk, and Alan IV, Duke of Brittany, son-in-law of the king. Two small thirty acre holdings seem to be embryo manors, but for the most part the land was farmed by twenty semi-free sub tenants, some called freemen, others known as sokemen. The size of their land varied widely, one man had thirty acres of arable and two acres of meadow while at the other end of the scale six men shared ten acres. The population can be estimated at around 125 persons, less than a third of the predominantly agricultural population of Victorian times. On the lands of Roger Bigot there were new masters on the spot in the form of Berard and Azelin, men with likely names for Norman army veterans.

The archaeological evidence from the vicinity of the church shows that from around AD 1100 activity there declined until a hundred years later the church stood completely isolated. The village had transferred piecemeal to the valley below, its flimsy dwellings scattered around the edges of small greens.

Tasburgh in the 19th century

Before 1800 most of the houses in the village were timber framed, but a growing shortage of wood, starting in the previous century, had led to the larger houses being built in brick with tiled, rather than thatched, roofs. Examples are Tasburgh House, Watermill House and Tasburgh Hall (then called Tasburgh Lodge). From the early 19th century smaller houses followed suit and early brick buildings can be seen on Low Road between and including the Old Horseshoes public house and Forge Cottage, all built between 1818 and 1840. Other houses and farm buildings of these times were of clay lump construction, surviving specimens include Rookery Cottage and White Horse Farm in Lower Tasburgh.

In the previous century the churchwardens had been able to balance their books on the income from fields given charitably, the Town Lands, but inflation during the Napoleonic Wars caused such an increase in costs that a compulsory Church Rate was necessary in order to raise money for major repairs to the church.

Mail coaches, carriers carts and freight wagons passing along Ipswich Road, then a well maintained turnpike, brought trade to Upper Tasburgh. Here stood a large inn, the Bird-in-Hand (now the Countryman) and close by was a smithy. In 1817 a shop stood near the site of the present Norwich bus stop, with numerous outhouses and a large orchard, today the site of Orchard Way. The shop survived until about 1940. In Church Road stood the Cherry Tree public house (now Cherry Tree House) at that time reputed to be a den of poachers.

Poverty continued to be a problem for many of the villagers, particularly during the agricultural depressions at the beginning and latter part of the century. In 1816 Thomas Clabburn left £400 invested in annuities for the relief of the parish poor, the interest to purchase bread or coal to be distributed on the first Monday of February each year. A handsome plate recording this charity can be seen on the vestry door of the church. Further relief for the needy came from the interest from £45 Consuls left by Miss Bateman in 1828. Alongside these the Meek Charity dating from 1598, was distributed. By 1840 the parish poor house, the Town House, was ninety years old and in a sad state of repair. The newly appointed rector, Henry Preston, did not hesitate to call it the 'Pest House' and donated materials for immediate repairs. At the same time he forbade the practice of forcing the old and infirm residents to work on the nearby allotments. In 1836 Pulham Workhouse, still clearly visible as Hillcrest Court on the A140, began to take over responsibility for the destitute of the area and the Town House was eventually converted into two cottages for the parish roadmen, being conveniently close to the parish gravel and marl pits in Marl Bottom.

The Old Rectory standing to the west of the church was built by the Rev Henry Preston in 1840 to replace the ruinous rectory he had inherited at what is today Glebe Cottage on Low Road. His capacious and elegant Victorian building has in turn been succeeded by a new rectory built close by in 1983.

The indefatigable Henry Preston brought education for all to Tasburgh when he founded a public elementary school on his rectory land alongside Church Hill (in those days, School Hill). The school was officially opened on 15 September 1844 with this prayer, 'Oh Lord my God, hearken unto the cry and to the prayer which thy servant prayeth unto Thee today, that Thine eyes may be open towards this house, night and day'.

There were sixty-two children attending school that first year. Most came from Tasburgh, but some walked from Tharston and Flordon; the youngest were five years old. In 1854 the schoolmistress was Eliza Goddard. The single room of the school was enlarged in 1880 to accommodate no less than 100 pupils, and in 1899 a new classroom was added to hold thirty infants.

A vast improvement in the transport of people, goods, livestock and mail came with the opening of the Eastern Union Railway through the area on 12 December 1849. Steam trains linked London, Ipswich, Diss and Norwich, five stopping daily at the local station at Flordon. At first the Norwich terminal was called Victoria Station and stood at the top of St Stephen's Street. A fine station was built at Flordon with buildings in typical Victorian style sporting large ornate chimneys, slate roofs and decorated brickwork. The first stationmaster was James Clayton. Close by stood the Railway Tavern kept by Jonathan Pawley.

The coming of railways to Norfolk brought a drastic fall in the heavy traffic of stage coaches, carriers and wagons along the main road through Tasburgh. Within a year sales of hay at the Bird-in-Hand fell from 50 tons annually to around 17, and all five licensed stage coach services disappeared.

In 1863 rail travel to Harleston, Bungay, Beccles and beyond became possible with the completion of the Waveney Valley Railway, which left the main line at Tivetshall Station. In 1881 a further branch line from Forncett Station to Wymondham opened up travel to many other parts of the county. All the railways in the area were absorbed into the Great Eastern Railway.

By 1851 the population of 363 at the beginning of the century had grown to 475, and the village contained 113 houses. This growth reflected the boom in agriculture in the mid-19th century. At this time Tasburgh was quite self-contained, with two blacksmiths, two shopkeepers, two butchers, a shoemaker, a wheelwright, a miller and a maltster. There were eleven farmers, a cattle dealer and a pig jobber, who slaughtered the pigs that most of the villagers kept. Tasburgh Hall, still called Tasburgh Lodge, was occupied by Commander Gwyn, a one-legged veteran of the Napoleonic Wars while Tasburgh Grange was a maltings named Maltings Farm. There were five licensed premises and a windmill in addition to the watermill. Later, the uncertainties of wind and water power were overcome by the installation of a steam engine at the watermill.

At this time the village comprised two separate straggles of houses, one along Saxlingham Lane and Low Road and the other clustered around Ipswich Road. The only dwellings in between were the Rectory and Old Hall Farm. Church Road was a tree-lined lane. The principal residence was Rainthorpe Hall, occupied by the Hon Frederick Walpole MP.

An agricultural depression in the last part of the 19th century caused the population to fall as low as 368, when countryfolk were forced to seek work in the towns. Despite this the school had to be extended twice; the population was falling, but families were getting larger!

Early 20th century

In the early years of the century Tasburgh continued as a mainly agricultural community, only one villager worked in Norwich, one at Dunston Hall and two on the nearby railway; all the rest found their livelihood in the village. In addition to farmers, smallholders and farm workers, there was a rat and mole catcher and a hurdle maker. It was very much a self-contained community, with four publicans, a miller with two mill workers, two blacksmiths, a carpenter / wheelwright, two thatchers, a bricklayer, two carriers, two general dealers, two grocers, a pork butcher, a baker and three shoemakers. In the public service there was a schoolmistress, two parish roadmen and a policeman. There were also two dressmakers, two washerwomen and a lady who treated people for sores, burns and abscesses. In 1911 the population was 355.

Tasburgh Lodge had been improved and renamed Tasburgh Hall by its owner P. Berney Ficklin. At Rainthorpe Hall, Sir Charles Harvey was spending considerable sums both on the hall and St Mary's Church. The rector from 1897 to 1922 was the Rev Walter Robert Hurd. Sons of these three gentlemen were to have distinguished careers. Horatio Berney Ficklin was a judge Advocate at the Nuremberg Trials of Nazi war criminals. Oliver Harvey became British Ambassador to France and was made Lord Harvey of Tasburgh. Richard Hurd was later Canon Hurd; he had a lasting love of Tasburgh and left a substantial bequest to the church on his death in 1975. Lord Harvey and Canon Hurd are both buried in the churchyard.

The Cherry Tree in Church Road was a free house and the publican made horehound beer, which was reputed to be good for coughs. He also sold cider which was made from apples grown in the orchard at the back. The landlady of The Bird in Hand was appropriately named Mrs Alice Sparrow. The Quaker chapel off Fairstead Lane was active, while the primitive Methodist Chapel on what is now Church Hill and the parish church both had large congregations and thriving Sunday schools.

William Moore, who spent much of his life in the village, tells us that his grandfather was estate bricklayer and chimney sweep for Rainthorpe Hall. To sweep the great chimneys at the hall, his grandfather would take one of his eight sons to climb up into the dark chimney as far as he safely could, carrying a hoe to scrape away the soot. While up the chimney, enveloped in clouds of soot, the lad would be required to help the sweeping rods on their way up the chimney and to try to rescue any brush which came adrift.

The local organisation for controlling the affairs of the village had devolved from the courts of the lords of the manors to the church during and after Tudor times. Now the Local Government Act of 1894 had passed the responsibility on to elected parish councils. The first recorded meeting of Tasburgh parish council was on 18 April 1900. The council was required to meet at least once a year within seven days of 25 March and not before 6 pm. The first council comprised William Briggs, William Duffield, Arthur Fuller, Samuel Rump, John and Robert Dix, with P. Berney Ficklin as chairman and Daniel Burgess as clerk. Meetings were held in the school room on a rather irregular basis. The cost of heating the room was two shillings, and Mrs Goose was employed to clean up afterwards for one shilling. One can only suppose that they were inveterate pipe and cigar smokers!

Taking over duties from a church which still retained a strong influence in the village was difficult, and many of the early meetings dealt solely with appointments to committees or as trustees to the various village charities. Local government was much more at parish level, and there were officers to appoint, such as the overseer and assistant overseer, whose duties included the collection of the parish rates. In 1914 Ernest Wright was appointed parish constable and later had an assistant in John Harrison.

Until after the First World War the railway was, for most people, the only link with the outside world, provided they could afford the fare. Motor cars were unreliable and far too expensive for all but the privileged few, while horse-drawn transport and cycles were only suitable for local journeys.

Something of the heavy casualties of the First World War is told by the War Memorial in the churchyard, which records the names of twelve Tasburgh men, who died at a time when the villagers fit for active service probably did not exceed forty-five. The Depwade Deanery Magazine of March 1919 tells of the passing of a wartime Tasburgh sailor, "... A hero of Zeebrugge. With deep regret we record the death of Charles T. Lyon of this parish. After twenty-one years service in the Royal Naval Reserve he rejoined in August 1914 and was commissioned to HM Trawler Aurora, being made Commodore of Group Seven in November. In the Zeebrugge Raid he showed the greatest gallantry ... after three years service in the war this hero was invalided out". The article goes on to say that Charles Lyon had been given a gold watch and chain for diving into the sea to rescue men during a storm in 1882 and that in 1916 he saved the lives of twenty-seven men from torpedoed fishing smacks.

Mrs Mildred Garrett has recalled that between the wars her father, the parish clerk Albert Matthews, started a bowls club with a green on the Mill Meadows between Tasburgh and Flordon. Also on the meadows were the two grass courts of the tennis club of the day. The Mill was not then in use, and was taken over once weekly for a dancing class, the instructor and pianist cycling out from Norwich. Once a month there was a dance, grandly call a 'ball', which often lasted until 3 am. A moonlit night was chosen, so that those walking from other villages could find their way home with ease. Mrs Garrett would cycle to Norwich or Wymondham to shop and well remembers Sir Charles and Lady Harvey travelling from Rainthorpe Hall to Tasburgh church in their carriage and pair. Her mother, together with Mrs Gates, the rector's wife, founded the first Women's Institute in Tasburgh in 1922.

Throughout the 1920s and 30s travel became easier, as a few people acquired motor-cycles, and cars and bus services were developed. Orange-coloured buses of United Automobile Services pioneered the route along the A140 until they were absorbed by Eastern Counties Omnibus Company in 1931. The Eastern Counties service was five buses daily, including Sundays. Lower Tasburgh was served by the buses of Mr Trudgil of Pulham St Mary. One bus ran each way on Wednesdays and Fridays, with two return journeys on Saturdays. The trip to Norwich called for either plumpness or fortitude, for the buses had wooden seats, and one was fitted with solid tyres. The return fare was nine old pence (less than four new pence).

At this time the present Grove Lane was called Coal House Hill, the Coal House standing on the site of the first house below the village hall. Here coal carted from Flordon Station was stored for distribution to the poor by the local charities. These charities had, by 1928, been condensed into three, the Fuel Allotment and Meek's Charity, the Poor's Land and the Clabburn and Bateman Charity. In that year they were all amalgamated into Tasburgh United Charities.
The parish council still owned the pair of cottages in Marl Bottom which had been the Town House, the parish poorhouse. Despite re-thatching in 1916 and again in 1925 they became a liability and were sold in 1928 to Dennis Cushion for seventy pounds. The beginnings of the village hall can be traced back to 1919 when the parish council resolved that 'a parish club or reading room should be erected centrally in the parish for the benefit of parishioners and for the fostering of a parochial feeling in the younger members of the parish'. In 1928 the parish subscribed to Norwich Fire Brigade the sum of four pounds yearly for their services. The brigade had stated that they were confident that they could get to Tasburgh in time, a brave statement indeed. This arrangement was made despite the fact that there was at the time a fire engine in use at Long Stratton, perhaps their charges were too high!

All we currently know of sport in Tasburgh in the inter-war years is that Mr Berney Ficklin of Tasburgh Hall gave a silver cup to be played for at football between Upper and Lower Tasburgh. It is believed that the trophy was only played for on three occasions, the last being in 1968 when the score was appropriately one all after extra time.

Children attended the school from the age of five and stayed until they were twelve; this was later extended to fourteen years. Bob Lammas was an exception, at the age of four he followed a flock of sheep passing his home. As they reached the school, he saw his brother and sister and went in to join them; meanwhile his distraught parents were searching the village for him. Miss Abbs, the teacher, gave Bob a halfpenny and made sure he reached home safely, but Bob was so upset at leaving the school that she allowed him to begin school one year early. Mrs Elizabeth Page recalls that she was quite overawed on her first day at school with so many children crowded into the building. The scholars were seated on long benches placed in a series of steps; as they grew older they were moved higher and higher up the steps.

The school log book, kept since 1922, records all visitors, events and repairs. Many entries report the difficulty of keeping the building warm in winter, often the temperature was only , and it was not always possible to light the fire because of sulphur fumes and smoke. A regular visitor was Sir Charles Harvey of Rainthorpe Hall, but in March 1927 a far less welcome visitor paid a call. A ferocious bull took possession of the playground, and Kenneth Riches and Herbert Sayer were sent to remove it! In the same year three boys earned notoriety in a different way, for on 22 November the punishment book records that Harold Riches (12), Arthur Hurry (12), and Fred Larter (11) received 'four strokes on hands and buttocks for milking Mr Curson's cow when standing in a meadow ... and for telling lies about it'.

Elizabeth Page remembers the annual school outings, paid for by Sir Charles Harvey, train journeys from Flordon to the seaside, her first sight of the sea. School concerts were held in the theatre at Rainthorpe Hall. Frances Rayner recalls starting at the school in 1939 when Mrs Cross was head teacher. All the children attended Sunday schools, the church school was taught by Alice Matthews, and all her pupils were in the choir.

At the outbreak of the Second World War the school had declined to fourteen children and was the smallest in the Deanery. With the coming of evacuees billeted out in the village, the numbers of scholars swelled, and a shift system had to be introduced, the village children attending in the mornings and the evacuees in the afternoons. Later, most of the evacuees were taught at Tasburgh Hall by additional teachers.

The 1939–45 World War started early in Tasburgh, for the parish council minute book records a request from Depwade Rural District Council in 1937 to appoint three air raid wardens. This done, two stirrup pumps were purchased to deal with incendiary bombs, and three more were given by the RDC. By 1939 there were five wardens. The parish council ran a competition in 1940 for those making the best use of their gardens for food production, and in 1941 a knitting group was formed to knit garments for the armed forces.

As part of a national scheme, a salvage officer was appointed, and a derelict building at the bottom of Grove Lane was used to store paper, bottles, jam jars and metal; collections were made by the WVS aided by schoolchildren. In addition to finding material for the war effort, the salvage fund raised money for local charities and especially for the village hall building fund.

With the fall of France, a parish invasion committee was set up in 1940, and a local unit of the Home Guard was formed under the charge of Ray Page the farmer then resident at Rookery Farm. The Home Guard post was in a building at The Bird in Hand (now the Countryman). William Moore reckons that the proximity of the public house was, on occasions, something of a temptation to the gallant patrol defending Tasburgh, as was the blazing fire in their guardroom. Tasburgh Hall became the headquarters of an army searchlight unit, with a searchlight on the lawn and another nearby at Hapton Hall. Later in the war, the army left, and the hall was used to house evacuees.

Beer supplies were severely restricted, the public houses opened only at weekends, when they were swamped by soldiers stationed in the area and, later in the war, by American servicemen from nearby airfields at Hethel, Tibenham and Hardwick. It was not unknown for the week's supply of beer to be consumed in an evening. William Moore says that some of the precious beer at the Horseshoes was held back for the locals, who had to call at the back door and drink secretly in the cellar. At these times the village policeman would leave his cycle in a field and approach on foot to join the clandestine drinkers.

William Moore also speaks of more direct contact with the war, of tracer bullet holes in his cycle shed and of his bed, which would jump off its blocks with the force of bomb explosions during the Norwich blitz. Late in the war, German flying bombs, nicknamed doodle-bugs, would pass over, but one day he was blown from his feet when a doodle-bug motor cut out and it exploded in a nearby field. Teacher, Miss Hewett, was once shown as absent due to 'the shock of the blitz'. The only wartime casualty known to occur in the village was of a soldier who was crushed by a tank while guiding it along Old Hall Farm Loke. Loss of life by residents on active service was much less than in the First World War; one name only is recorded on the War Memorial.

To save petrol during the war, buses were powered by gas, which was produced in a coke burner towed behind the bus on a two-wheeled trailer. William Moore says that very limited power resulted, and the buses could only manage about fifteen miles per hour. On reaching Dunston Hill the passengers had perforce to alight and walk up the hill behind the struggling bus.
During the war, scholars would walk to school carrying their lunch of meat paste, jam or even lard sandwiches, together with their gas mask and identity card; anyone forgetting the last two items could be sent back home to get them.

Bob Lammas and William Moore both recall a wartime drama in the village when a spy was captured. He lived in a cottage on Church Hill and toured the district on a bicycle visiting the Horseshoes public house to mix with the soldiers drinking there. One night a vigilant Home Guard saw a flashing light from the cottage as enemy planes were flying over. The incident was reported, and shortly after the Tasburgh Home Guard were called out to patrol the area until a light armoured vehicle and army lorries with Military Police arrived. The spy was arrested and a radio transmitter was found in the cottage chimney.

Late 20th century

William Moore has given a vivid description of Tasburgh some 50 years ago, of cottages lit by paraffin lamps, tin baths by the fire, water from wells and bucket toilets at the bottom of the garden. A family of seven occupied a cottage in Saxlingham Lane which had but two rooms downstairs and two up, with an outside wash-house and toilet; it was aptly named Teapot House. An even smaller dwelling stood alongside the Old Post Office, having just one room on each storey to accommodate a family of seven.

William tells of the terrible winter of 1947, when heavy snow fell in February and the freeze-up lasted until April, to be followed immediately by heavy flooding. Coal was still rationed, so stocks were low, and few people could afford to have electricity laid on; most of the villagers had to rely on such firewood as they could find. Williarn Moore's family were cut off for three weeks, by which time they were almost out of food. They had eaten all their hens apart from two left to lay eggs. They shot what game they could and eventually had to resort to trapping small birds. By digging through the snow to Manor Farm they were able to obtain milk. Help came when paths were cleared into the village, partly by Italian prisoners of war held at Long Stratton.

In those days shopping was a very different activity. William explains that prepackaging was minimal in the four village shops. Sugar came in hundredweight sacks, cheeses were bound in hessian and weighed 28 lb, butter was in 14 1b blocks, and biscuits were loose in 14 1b tins. Serving a customer took some time, for the grocer had to cut, weigh, price and pack each item while waiting customers enjoyed a gossip. Milk was delivered by Mr Alford, a dairy farmer from High Road Farm on the Ipswich Road. He came round daily with a horse and trap, from which fresh milk was measured to order from a metal churn.

In 1945 Tasburgh Women's Institute was relaunched. The earliest surviving minutes are those of 1947, when Mrs Rosemary Hastings of Rainthorpe Hall was president, Mrs Larner, secretary and Mrs Mann, treasurer. Meetings were held monthly at Rainthorpe Hall with talks, demonstrations, competitions, flower shows and whist drives. The quality of WI cooking was such that they were praised in the press on several occasions and in 1969 won a silver rose bowl for their preserves. They formed a choir and helped the village in many ways, providing refreshments at fetes and plays, organising the poppy day collection and operating 'meals on wheels'. The WI also raised funds to pay for tables, chairs and other items at the village hall, where a plaque acknowledges their efforts. For their own enjoyment they organised outings to, what were in those days, such far-away places as Clacton, Felixstowe and Woburn.

From the wartime salvage fund and from many money raising events, including the saving of pennies by the schoolchildren £562 16s 8d had, by May 1947, been raised for a village hall. For a small, relatively poor village this was a most creditable amount, since it was worth about £16,000 at today's money values. A leading light in the efforts to provide a hall was Mr K. Riches, chairman of the village hall committee. In 1949 a public meeting was called to discuss proposals for a hall, one being to rent a building. A breakthrough came the next year with the public-spirited offer of the gift of two fields covering about four acres by John Everson of Old Hall Farm and his sons Russell and George. Thus the village gained both a playing field and a site for the village hall midway between Upper and Lower Tasburgh.

The first village hall committee represented the major organisations in the village at the time and comprised: Mr B. W. Cross, Parish Council; Mrs H. M. Mann, Women's Institute; Rev R. Maudsley, Parochial Church Council; Mr R. G. Clarke, Methodist Church; Mr J. Cadman, Tasburgh United Football Club; Mrs C. E. Cross, School Manager.

The hall was opened on 8 September 1953 by Mrs Rosemary Hastings.

On the death of Canon A. E. Gates in 1948 Tasburgh had been the home of only three rectors in 111 years. In the next forty-six years there were to be no less than nine rectors, the first being Rev R. Maudsley. Henceforth Tasburgh rectors were also responsible for Tharston.

After the Second World War, Tasburgh Football Club played on a tiny sloping pitch in Rainthorpe Park, close to the Newton Flotman-Flordon Road. They were not popular with visiting teams, since the pitch was riddled with molehills and rabbit holes. By 1952 the football team had moved to the new playing field, but in their keenness to leave behind the obstacles of their old field they failed to observe that the playing field was littered with sharp flints. Despite compulsory flint-picking sessions for players and officials before every match, players received many nasty cuts, and the club was forced to move yet again.

An entry in the Eastern Daily Press of 28 August 1953 records the Annual General Meeting of Tasburgh United Football Club, where it was decided to form a combined football and cricket club under the title of Tasburgh United Sports Club. The chairman was Mr K. Riches, and the secretary Mr J. Cadman.
In the meanwhile local youths had developed another form of sport. On the land where Harvey Close now stands a cycle speedway track was developed, and the team racing there in the Depwade League had the proud name of the Tasburgh Tigers.

By 1954 the football pitch at the playing field had been relaid, together with a cricket pitch and practice wicket. The village cricket team played on Saturdays and Sundays for some ten years. In this period football flourished, with three teams and many supporters; it was not unknown for three coaches to be required to convey the first team and supporters to away matches. In the 1956 / 57 season Tasburgh led the Norwich and District League. Within the next twenty years the football team faded then disbanded.

The infant teacher at the school after the war was Miss Hewitt, who travelled every day from St Faith's on a motor-cycle. Two senior boys were detailed to wait at the school gate every morning to grab the cycle as she arrived and hold it while she disengaged gear, switched off and dismounted. What arrangements she made at the other end of her journey we do not know! Mrs Elizabeth Page remembers that Miss Hewitt delighted in taking the children down through Bluebell Wood while William Moore recalls the outside school toilets of corrugated iron and that water had to be fetched to the school in buckets filled at the rectory.

Through the 1950s life at the school changed. There was a rail outing to London in 1954, and regular bus trips were made to Wymondham swimming pool. Attendance rose to fifty-seven in 1959, when the larger schoolroorn was divided by a curtain to make two, not very soundproof, classrooms. By now there were two cloakrooms, together with a scullery to help deal with school meals, which were prepared at Newton Flotman. The age limit for scholars was reduced to eleven years in 1959, the older children attending school in Long Stratton.
In 1952 Rev Maudsley moved from the parish to be replaced by Rev Percy Gresty, who set about reforming the church choir with the able assistance of the organist and village postmaster, Phillip Lammas. The choir became eighteen strong and reached such a high standard that on occasions the church was packed.

For a while after the war the railway station at Flordon continued to play an important part in the life of the village as a source of mail, parcels, newspapers and coal, while farmers used the railway to transport their sugar beet, corn and cattle. As motor transport became ever more affordable its door to door convenience killed off much of the rail traffic and Flordon Station was closed in 1961 as part of the Beeching cuts after a life of 112 years. William Moore tells us that the landlord of the Railway Tavern at this time was Mr Brookes, who supplemented his income by cutting hair; boys could usually persuade him to sell them half a pint of cider while waiting for their hair to be cut.

In 1961 the population of Tasburgh was 343, slightly less than the 1911 figure of 355. While some old cottages had been demolished and council houses had appeared on Grove Lane, Church Road and Ipswich Road the village remained completely rural in character. This changed dramatically after 1961 as widespread house building, mostly in Upper Tasburgh, led to a trebling of the population to reach 1117 in 1991.

The first area to be developed was that now occupied by Valley Road, Willow Close and Curson Road. Mr Shepherd of Cherry Tree House applied for planning permission, but this was turned down on the grounds that Tasburgh was not designated as a development area, that housing would be intrusive on the landscape and that the land would be better used for agriculture. Mr Oliver, a Hempnall builder, appealed against the refusal pointing out that the land was light, stony and infertile and that there was a real demand for housing in the area. The tide now began to turn for neither Depwade Rural District Council nor the parish council objected to the appeal, this despite a local resident complaining that only five of the nine parish councillors had attended the relevant meeting and that the matter was not on the published agenda. Nevertheless, the appeal was dismissed, one of the grounds being that the school was due to close.

Faced with a growing countywide demand for more housing the County Council relented and later in 1961 gave permission for Mr T. Riches to build fifty-six houses in the Valley Road area. This change of heart cleared the way for further successful applications. Building at Valley Road went ahead and in 1964 Mr K. Riches obtained clearance to develop Orchard Way. Planning proposals and village growth increased the workload of the parish council, who found it necessary to hold monthly meetings.

The needs of the growing village led to the formation of the Playgroup by Christine Morris and Jenny Harvey in 1968 with meetings twice weekly at the village hall. By this date other organisations had arisen in addition to the Women's Institute and Football Club; Tasburgh Players had established themselves at the theatre in Rainthorpe Hall, there was a Church Youth Club, a Christian Alliance children's club, a Bingo Club and WI whist drives. A particularly lively club was the Young Women's Association with fortnightly meetings, outings and parties, among their highly varied activities was a midsummer ball, also a barbecue and swim by the River Tas at Saxlingham Thorpe. Two major annual events throughout the 60s and 70s were the church fete at Rainthorpe Hall and the village fete at the playing field.

In September 1968 the low-lying parts of the village suffered from an extensive flood, water entering houses at Cat's Corner and along Low Road from Watermill House to Rookery House. A fire engine pumped three feet of water from Glebe Cottage and Mr J. Crawshay of Tasburgh Grange was able to sail a sixteen-foot dinghy from his front drive across the nearby meadows.
The next area of housing growth was Woodland Rise and Everson Road, which received planning permission in 1969. From 1971 the pace of change became such that it can only be clearly recorded on a year by year basis.

1971 The population had almost doubled to 610. The Rev T. Macnaughton-Jones, who had been rector of Tasburgh and Tharston since 1958 retired, to be replaced by Rev Oswald Glass.

1972 Much concern having been expressed about overcrowding at the school, the parish council lobbied for a new school. The response of the education authority was to erect two portakabins. St Mary's Guild for women was started, led by Mrs Glass, the rector's wife.

1973 Planning permission was given for the building of Everson Close while Mr D. Addington of Old Hall Farm obtained consent for the development for housing of eleven acres behind the council houses in Church Road. Here Wilcon built the Churchfields development over the next ten years. Additionally to the major housing schemes of the 60s and 70s, individual, generally larger, dwellings were built in both Upper and Lower Tasburgh, Harvey Close having been developed in 1966. The First Tasburgh Brownies were formed in 1973 while the Youth Club, not for the first or last time, suffered from a shortage of leaders and had to resort to fortnightly meetings. Lack of support led to the closure of the Methodist Chapel.

1974 From Saxon times Tasburgh had been part of Depwade Hundred until, at the turn of this century, the larger Depwade Rural District Council was formed. Now an even larger local authority took over, South Norfolk District Council. The ancient name of Depwade continued only in the title of the church Deanery.

1975 The 130th anniversary of the school was celebrated by a Victorian Day. The headmaster, Mr Peter Ramm, teachers and scholars all wore Victorian costume and lessons were given in Victorian style. The Playgroup was now being run by Mrs Jean Campling and sessions had been increased to three mornings weekly. 1976 Negotiations began fora site fora new school; with the rapid expansion of the village the school roll stood at seventy-six, the next year it was to reach 100.

1977 This was the year of the Queen's Jubilee and Tasburgh entered into the celebrations with a will. Jubilee Day started with the church bells ringing, followed by children's sports on the playing field, after which the youngsters were presented with Jubilee crown coins. After a meal at the village hall the fun moved to Rainthorpe Hall for a children's party. Here Tasburgh Players gave a Jubilee Revue, which was followed in the evening by a bonfire and fireworks display at the playing field. The chief organiser was Mr James and the cost of £220 was met entirely by fund raising. After a short break Tasburgh Players had been reformed by a small group headed by Lynn McKinney with Mrs Rosemary Hastings as president. This year also saw the relaunch of a tennis club. They played at Tasburgh Grange by kind permission of Mr and Mrs Crawshay, later they also played at Tasburgh House. Enthusiastic fund raising enabled grass courts to be established at the playing field and the club immediately set their sights on providing hard courts. Another 'birth' in 1977 was the Babysitting Circle.

1978 A most welcome addition to the church came on 29 October when Mrs Walton of Tasburgh Hall opened the church room with its kitchen and toilet, built as an extension to the vestry. It was chiefly due to the efforts of Mr and Mrs Walton that the project was so quickly financed and completed.

1979 A new rector, Rev M. Fitzgerald arrived with responsibility for Tasburgh, Tharston, Flordon and Forncett. Work started on the long-awaited new school and the Young Women's Association was changed to the Monday Club.
Last Days Of School

1980 The new school was opened on 2 June by the Bishop of Norwich. There were sixty-five pupils at the new lower age limit of eight years, older children being bussed to the Middle and High Schools at Long Stratton. Our

Public spirited Victorian rector, Henry Preston, who founded our first village school would have been proud of the new school and of its subsequent achievements. It is entirely appropriate that both the present school and the road upon which it stands should bear his name. This year saw the last performance of Tasburgh Players at Rainthorpe Hall, they moved to the village hall taking the stage from Rainthorpe with them. 1980 saw the'launch'of the First Tasburgh Sea Scouts by Bernard Minns assisted by Lyndon Bringloe and Tim Braddock.

1981 The ever-growing population reached 930. The Tennis Club's hard courts were brought into use and the Old School was converted into a private house. Yet again the Youth Club was short of leaders and was only able to provide a weekly disco before ceasing altogether for a while.

1981, Norwich City FC manager, Ken Brown, hands out Royal Wedding crowns to Tasburgh scholars following postponement of sports day due to rain.

1982 The Rev R. Blakeley took over as rector. A great fillip to village activities came with the formation of the Inter-Village Sports Team to take part in competitions initiated by the Sports Council. With Pam Moore as co-ordinator a team competed in the district round at Harleston. Junior and senior sections took part in five-a-side football, netball, badminton, table tennis, a relay race and, for the seniors only, darts. Tasburgh won the district competition for small villages and continued to win at district level every year until the competition ceased. This entitled them to go forward to the county round where, as often as not, they met their constant rivals, Great and Little Massingham. This year the Badminton Club was formed as a direct outcome of the inter-village sports activities.

1983 The village hall was extended by the building of a new block across the front to provide an entrance hall, a committee room, toilets and an improved kitchen. A new rectory was completed close by the rectory built 141 years earlier. The Churchfields development was completed bringing to an end the burst of expansion in the village which had begun in 1961. The Inter-Village Sports Team beat the Massinghams in the county final and went forward to the regional competition at Shotley near Ipswich. After a dreadful start they recovered to take Tasburgh to the giddy heights of regional champions. New leaders having come forward the Youth Club restarted while the Playgroup extended its sessions from three to four weekly.

1984 Another offspring of the Inter-Village Sports Team was the Netball Club, formed this year. Tim Braddock took over as scout leader when both his founder colleagues moved away from the village. A cub scout pack was formed, but within a year its leader also moved away and the pack had to be disbanded.

1985 The Rev T. Raven took over as rector. The Monday Club ceased activities, but the Youth Club had by now been full reactivated with a wide programme of activities.

1986 The Cub Scout Pack was reformed.

1987 Maddy Munday took over the reins of Tasburgh Players, who were giving two performances a year.

1988 The membership of the WI having fallen to eleven, it was felt necessary to close down an organisation which had in the past made a major contribution to village life. Mrs Gertrude Hardingham had been president of the Women's Institute for the past twenty-four years. A new group on the scene was the Carpet Bowls Club.

1989 Cub Scout five-a-side football led to the formation of an under-12 football team playing in the Norwich Sunday Youth League, football had returned to Tasburgh. Ken Ransom, together with Roger and Helen Burnett, had the idea to link Tasburgh with a European village. So it was that Ken and Roger crossed the Channel together with Gayle Macdonald and Steve Beckett representing the parish council and the Inter-Village Sports Team. Their objective was Linden, thirty kilometres from Brussels. Their original idea that the link might be on sporting lines soon changed for one based on two-way family visits. Thus Eurolink was formed and visits have taken place every year since with ties between the two villages growing ever stronger.

1990 On the retirement of Rev Raven the new rector was Rev David Harrison. Mrs Dyan McKelvey took over as headmistress after long service with Tasburgh School. This year the school was runner-up in a national environmental competition. A current annual event which can be traced back to 1990 is the Parish Harvest Supper run jointly by the village hall committee and the church. Despite the extension made in 1983 the village hall had become ever more inadequate for the increasing demands made upon it. After a public meeting the Village Hall Improvement Steering Committee was formed, it decided that the best plan was to extend the existing building and commenced fund raising and seeking grant aid. This year saw the demise of the First Tasburgh Brownie Pack after a life of seventeen years.

1991 The population of the village topped the thousand mark at 1117. Tasburgh had changed in thirty years from not much more than a rural hamlet into a large, mainly suburban, village. On 18 August the village sign was unveiled Following a competition the design was based on the ideas of three pupils of the school, Paul Beckett, Scott Harwood and Peter Starkey. The carpet bowls team competed with great credit in the inter-village competitions winning both the junior and senior events, but this was the last year of the competition and thus the end of the line for the highly successful Tasburgh team. The trophy cabinet in the village hall bears ample testimony to all those who represented the village so valiantly over the ten years of the competition. The junior arm of scouting was further strengthened by the formation of a Beaver colony for six- to eight-year-olds. Following a stewardship campaign by church members, two weekly activities were started on Wednesday afternoons in the church room. The Coffee Pot offered a club for all villagers followed in term time by Trekkers for school age children. After a hard fought campaign, mainly by mothers led by Sue Bing, a much needed footpath was completed alongside Grove Lane between Church Hill and the village hall.

1992 Tasburgh Festival of Gardens on Sunday 21 June gave many the opportunity to visit ten gardens displaying a wide variety of styles and sizes. The joint organisers were the Village Hall Improvement Committee and the church. The school again won national honours with the presentation of a curriculum award at the Barbican Centre, London. A copy of the Tasburgh village sign was fixed to the Linden school wall in memory of Ken Ransom, a founder member of Eurolink. At the Ipswich Road bus stop the parish council erected a most welcome bus shelter. With the twin objects of providing a social centre and raising money for the village hall improvements a Social Club committee was formed, chaired by Bob Bush.

1993 To provide a clubroom for the proposed Social Club, alterations were made to the front block of the village hall and legal moves made with a view to opening the club in 1994. Extensive repairs to the church were completed including the refurbishment of the tiles and exterior walls the cost being met from church funds, grants, a loan and a general appeal to all parishioners. Following the move from the parish of Rev D. Harrison the local parish grouping was changed, Tasburgh and Tharston remaining linked as they had been since 1948, but Forncett and Flordon were detached to be replaced by Saxlingham and Shotesham.

The 21st century

2010 (1 May) A group called "Recreation For All," an amalgam of village hall user groups, got together to organise Tasburgh Community Festival. The Festival was scheduled to run for the two days of the Bank Holiday. It was officially opened by ex Norwich City players, Craig Fleming and Darren Huckerby.

2011 (June) and the 2nd Tasburgh Community Festival took place in the grounds of the village hall.

2012 (23 June) The 3rd Tasburgh Community Festival attracted a crowd. This year the inside of the village hall was used to accommodate three local bands. The day had an Olympic theme to it and started with a torch parade from the village sign.
Arena acts included A World of Wings, the Lowestoft Dog Agility Display Team and Dr Ken the juggler.

Governance
An electoral ward in the same name exists. This ward stretches north east to Shotesham with a total ward population of 2,399.

Notable people
 Sir Malcolm Bradbury (1932–2000), author. Buried in the churchyard of St Mary's parish church.
 Tanya Burr (1989–present), YouTube vlogger. Grew up in the village.
 Major General Horatio Berney-Ficklin (1892–1961), British Army officer, served in both World War I and World War II.

Neighbours
Nearby villages include Flordon, Hapton, Tharston, Long Stratton, Newton Flotman and Morningthorpe.

References

http://kepn.nottingham.ac.uk/map/place/Norfolk/Tasburgh

External links

 Tasburgh Village Hall
 Tasburgh Parish Council
 GENUKI entry for Tasburgh parish
 St Mary's on the European Round Tower Churches website

South Norfolk
Villages in Norfolk
Civil parishes in Norfolk